Sambucus cerulea or Sambucus nigra ssp. cerulea, with the common names blue elderberry and blue elder, is a coarse textured shrub species of elder in the family Adoxaceae.

Description 
It normally grows rather wildly from several stems, which can be heavily pruned (or even cut to the ground) during winter dormancy.

The leaves are hairless, strongly pointed and sharp-toothed. They are elliptical to lanceolate, and the blade extends unequally on the stalk at the base.

They are umbel-shaped, normally with 4 to 5 rays extending from the base. The flowers have a strong, unpleasant odor.

The fruits given are berry-like drupes. They are juicy, round, and approximately 4–6 mm in diameter. They are bluish-black, with a glaucous powder coating (helping to distinguish them from other elderberries), which lends them a pale powdery blue colour. Each fruit contains 3 to 5 small seed-like stones, each enclosing a single seed.

Taxonomy 
The plant is classified by several different botanical names. Both the current United States Department of Agriculture database and The Jepson Manual of California flora (2013) classify it as S. nigra subsp. cerulea.

The Sunset Western Garden Book identifies the plant as Sambucus mexicana, and note use of S. caerulea also.

The botanist Victor King Chesnut (1867–1938) had classified it as S. glauca in 1902, when studying the plants used by the Indigenous peoples of California in Mendocino County.

Distribution and habitat

S. cerulea is native to the Western United States, northwestern Mexico, and British Columbia. It is found from the Pacific coasts, through California and the Great Basin, to Montana, Wyoming, Texas and Oklahoma.

This species grows at elevations below , in diverse habitats of mountains and hills, valleys, riparian zones, open places in woodlands and forests, and exposed slopes where moisture is reachable.

Toxicity
The raw berries contain a toxin which, if eaten raw, may induce nausea in some people.

Uses
The flower blossoms can be used to make tea. The fruits can be eaten raw (despite containing a toxin), dried, or as jelly.

Native American
The indigenous peoples of North America with the plant in their homelands use the leaves, blossoms, bark, roots, and wood for preparing traditional medicinal remedies, taken internally or applied externally. The fresh, dried, and cooked berries are used for food.

Some tribes used the wood to make musical instruments, such as flutes, clappers, and small whistles; and smoking implements. Soft wood was used as a spindle "twirling stick" to make fire by friction. The bark was used to produce a remedy for fever. Stems and berries were used as a dye for basket weaving materials.

The Concow tribe of the Mendocino region calls the plant nō-kōm-hē-i′-nē in the Konkow language.

Cultivation
S. nigra ssp. cerulea is cultivated as an ornamental plant by plant nurseries, for planting in traditional, native plant, and habitat gardens. It is also used for natural landscaping and habitat restoration projects. It can become a multi-trunk tree when trained from youth with only several dominant trunks.

The plant is beneficial in wildlife gardens, its flowers attract pollinators, butterflies and hummingbirds, and its berries feed other bird species and chipmunks.

Footnotes

References

External links

 
 
 

cerulea
Berries
Bird food plants
Butterfly food plants
Drought-tolerant plants
Garden plants of North America
Flora of Northeastern Mexico
Flora of Northwestern Mexico
Flora of the Northwestern United States
Flora of the Southwestern United States
Flora of British Columbia
Flora of California
Flora of New Mexico
Flora of the Cascade Range
Flora of the Sierra Nevada (United States)
Natural history of the California chaparral and woodlands
Plants used in Native American cuisine
Plants used in traditional Native American medicine
Flora without expected TNC conservation status